Stiven Mesa Londoño (born 27 January 2000), known professionally as Blessd, is a Colombian singer-songwriter and rapper. Born in Itagüí, he has worked with several well-known artists such as Maluma, Justin Quiles, and Myke Towers. In October 2021, Blessd signed with Warner Music Latina and released his first studio album which is called Hecho en Medellín. His most popular song from the album, entitled "Medallo", has reached number 1 in Colombia and has over 100 million views on YouTube. In March 2022, he was nominated for three Heat Latin Music Awards including Best New Artist, Best Artist – Andean Region and Best Collaboration for the song "Medallo".

Career

Beginnings (2015–2021) 
Blessd became interested in music due to the influence of his uncle who was a rapper. His uncle would play songs for him and help him practice freestyling. He began performing as a hobby when he was 15 and competed in rap battles in Bogotá. He was connected to music producer Lil Jay through a friend but did not have very much money. To pay for recording his songs, Blessd would start his day at 2:00 am helping his father and grandparents sell fruits and vegetables in the Central Mayorista de Antioquia in Itagüí. After working with his father in the morning he would go to school and sell candies to his classmates. After school, he would use the little money he made to record sections of his songs.

At first, Blessd was exclusively a rapper and his first songs were shared throughout Medellin using WhatsApp. To reach a wider audience, his producer Lil Jay convinced him to try out Reggaeton and put together some more romantic songs. One of those songs was "Una", which became his first song to go viral in Medellin. Because he did not have any money to shoot a video for "Una", Blessd convinced the owner of Megastore Tienda, a clothing store in Medellin, to invest in the song and help pay for the video. After a month and a half, "Una" became a hit on YouTube and got more than three million plays. After "Una" went viral in Medellin, Blessd began performing in schools and at small concerts. He left school to focus on performing and performed at over 500 schools across Antioquia.

Soon after, he met his manager, Dr. Velasquez, who signed him to the label JM World Music.

In October 2020, Blessd released the song "Viernes Social" with Puerto Rican artists Alexis, Yomo, Amaro and Xantos. The song became the number one song on the radio in Colombia and had more than one million plays in the first 24 hours. In November 2020, Blessd and fellow Colombian Ryan Castro released the song "Lejania". The song was successful not only in Medellin but across Colombia and in Costa Rica.

In January 2021, Blessd released the song "Imposible". After hearing about this song from his best friend, Blessd was contacted by Maluma about joining the song for a remix. He met Maluma for the first time when they filmed the video for "Imposible" Remix at Maluma's home. The remix was produced the Prodigiez, and came out in May 2021.

In the summer of 2021, Blessd released the song "Hace Tiempo". After just one month on YouTube, the song had over 10 million views. In July, he was named by YouTube as a part of their Foundry Class of 2021. In August, Blessd released the remix to his song "Dos Problemas" which featured Puerto Rican singer Javiielo and Venezuelan rappers Big Soto and Neutro Shorty.

Hecho en Medellín (2021–present) 
In late 2021, Blessd released his first studio album titled Hecho en Medellín which has 10 songs including "Hace Tiempo", "Quien TV" and "Medallo". He completed his first tour in the United States with shows in New Jersey, Massachusetts and Florida. He also completed a tour in Europe where he sang for sold-out crowds in Madrid, Barcelona, Paris, Málaga and Bilbao. Blessd was one of he opening acts for fellow Colombian artist Karol G for her Bichota tour stop in their hometown of Medellín . He sang for the first time in many new cities outside of Colombia including Mexico City, Mexico, Caracas, Venezuela and Guayaquil, Ecuador.

In January 2022, Blessed was nominated for a Lo Nuestro Award in the category "Artista Revelación Masculino" and was highlighted by Billboard as one of 22 Latin "artists to watch" in 2022. Alongside fellow Colombian Ryan Castro, he released two new songs – "Niña de Mis Sueños" and "Quien TV" Remix. The two had not worked together for almost a year after the success of "Lejania" because of differences between Blessd and the record label Castro was signed to concerning the remix of "Lejania". On 14 February, MonitorLatino reported that "Quien TV" Remix had become the most popular song in Colombia and "Niña de Mis Sueños" was charting at number 6 in the country according to Billboard.

Personal life 
Blessd was born in 2000 in Medellín, Colombia. His parents separated when he was young and he moved with his mother to live in Bogotá. In an interview with MoluscoTV, he describes his adolescence in Bogotá as difficult because he had a hard time communicating with his step-father and was far away from the rest of his family. He began to spend a lot of time away from his home and got into many situations he describes as "dangerous". After a fight, he spent a short time in a detention center for minors. This experience made him want to change his path and he decided to return to Medellín.

When he returned to Medellín he lived with his maternal grandparents. Before leaving school to pursue his music career, he studied at the Institución Educativa Pedro Estrada. At 17, he began working with his father and grandparents selling fruits and vegetables at the Central Mayorista de Antioquia.

Blessd is a Catholic who learned about religion from his grandmother. He named himself Blessd because of the faith he has had since he was a young child. He has many tattoos of religious imagery such as Jesus and The Virgin Mary on his arm and a cross on the back of his neck. He also has the word "bendito", which means blessed, tattooed across his fingers. He is often photographed before his performances on his knees praying with his team.

When asked about his inspirations, Blessd credits American singer and rapper Arcangel and Venezuelan rapper Akapellah. He is also inspired by the Colombian artists he grew up listening to with his grandparents such as vallenato singer Diomedes Diaz and salsa singer Joe Arroyo.

For a few years, Blessd dated Colombian influencer Nicole Rivera, who is known on social media as La Suprema. She appears alongside him in the video for his song "Confia en Mi". He confirmed the end of their relationship in on 15 March 2022, via Twitter.

Discography

Studio albums

Charting songs

Singles

Awards and nominations

Premio Lo Nuestro

Premios Nuestra Tierra 
Premios Nuesta Tierra is an accolade that recognizes outstanding achievement in the Colombian Music Industry.

Heat Latin Music Awards

References

External links 

 Blessd on Instagram

2000 births
Colombian singer-songwriters
Colombian rappers
Warner Music Latina artists
Musicians from Medellín
Urbano musicians
21st-century Colombian male singers
People from Medellín
Living people